Punish the Sinners is a horror novel and the second novel by author John Saul, first published in 1978. The novel concerns a rash of violent suicides at a Catholic high school. There is an audiobook narrated by Jonathan Davis on Audible. Punish the Sinners was the first book with a UPC code on the cover.

Plot
The plot follows Latin and psychology teacher Peter Balsam as he is hired to work at St. Francis Xavier High School in the small town of Neilsville, Washington. The principal of the school is Monsignor Peter Vernon, an old friend of his from seminary school before Balsam left to pursue an unsuccessful marriage. Soon after his arrival, Balsam's students begin to commit violent suicide, with some in the community believing that Balsam's classes are inspiring the suicides. It is up to Balsam to investigate both the suicides and the school's involvement before more students die a horrible death.

Reception

In his book John Saul: a critical companion, Paul Bail wrote that the plot "owes as much to the protagonist's personal flaws as to the villain's conspiratorial machinations. The hero's inner compulsions repeatedly draw him to the very danger that threatens to consume him." Bail also noted that the book differed from some of Saul's other works in that it focused on a male protagonist and that it contained "factually historical underpinnings".

Of the abridged audiobook, AudioFile criticized the book's abridging, stating it was a "particularly graceless and inept reading that should horrify the author, if no one else". The Library Journal wrote that Punish the Sinners was an "Essential for those libraries with Saul fans", praising the audiobook's narration.

References

American thriller novels
American horror novels
1978 American novels